Jamie Crane-Mauzy (Jamie MoCrazy)  is an American freestyle skier and motivational speaker.

Life and career 
Jamie Crane-Mauzy was born in Westport, Connecticut. At the age of 9, she won State Championships in gymnastics and skiing. She graduated with a BA in Communications from Westminster College in 2019.

Crane-Mauzy was the first female skier to land a double backflip in a competition at the Winter X Games XVII in Aspen, Colorado. Her professional career ended after a skiing accident in 2015, and she now works as a motivational speaker.

2015 skiing accident
On April 11 2015, Crane-Mauzy was involved in a serious accident while competing in the World Tour Finals in Whistler. In an attempt to move up from fourth place, she upgraded her flat 3 to a double flat seven. She completed the jump and landed on her feet, but caught her edge and whiplashed her head onto the snow. Her brain immediately began bleeding in 8 different spots and her brain stem was damaged, causing complete paralysis on her right side. She was treated in Vancouver General Hospital, where she remained for 8 days before again being transported to Intermountain Medical Center in Murray, UT.

Freestyle skiing results
 2010 1st Junior World Championships, New Zealand
2013 7th Winter X Games XVII (Slopestyle) Aspen, Colorado
2015 13th FIS Freestyle World Ski Championships (Slopestyle) Kreischberg, Austria
2015 13th FIS Freestyle World Ski Championships (halfpipe) Kreischberg, Austria

References

External links 
 

1992 births
American female freestyle skiers
21st-century American women
Living people